The siege of Pécs was fought from 14 to 22 October 1686, in the city of Pécs in southwestern Hungary, between the armies of the Ottoman Empire and of the Holy Roman Empire.

After the castle of Buda was wrested from Ottoman rule in 1686, the Austrian army advanced to capture Pécs. The Austrian advance guard broke into the city and pillaged it, the Ottomans saw that they could not hold the city, so they burnt it and withdrew into the castle. The army led by Louis of Baden occupied the city on 14 October, and destroyed the aqueduct leading to the castle. The Ottomans had no other choice but to surrender, which they did on 22 October. The siege devastated the previously prosperous region and the area was depopulated by the peasants who fled from the Austrian soldiers.

References 

Battles of the Great Turkish War
Sieges involving the Ottoman Empire
Sieges involving the Holy Roman Empire
Conflicts in 1686
1686 in Europe